Time Is Money is a 1923 German silent film directed by Fred Sauer and starring Grete Reinwald, Colette Corder and Fritz Rasp. The film was released in Germany with its title in English. It premiered at the Marmorhaus in Berlin. The film's sets were designed by the art director Fritz Lederer.

Cast
 Grete Reinwald as Irene Arven
 Colette Corder as Colette
 Alfred Gerasch as Georg de Gobert
 Fritz Rasp as François
 Hermann Picha as Glanden
 Harry Berber as Mac Collin
 Heinz Salfner as Marc Arven
 C.W. Tetting as William
 Philipp Manning

References

Bibliography
 Bock, Hans-Michael & Bergfelder, Tim. The Concise CineGraph. Encyclopedia of German Cinema. Berghahn Books, 2009.

External links

1923 films
Films of the Weimar Republic
German silent feature films
Films directed by Fred Sauer
German black-and-white films
1920s German films